Gardenia is the debut studio album by Mexican-American singer and songwriter Monogem, which was released worldwide on September 2, 2021. The album was supported by five singles: Paraíso, Bésame Mucho, Sólo Amor, Dame La Fuerza, and Magia.

Release and promotion 
Monogem announced the album through her social medias, via Instagram and Twitter, alongside its art cover and title. In January 2022, Monogem announced a limited edition vinyl for the debut album through Qrates, a vinyl record pressing company. One of Monogem's songs, "Soy Lo Que Soy", was featured in Netflix's comedy drama series, Rebelde; season one, episode five. The single, "Paraíso", was also featured in HBO Max's comedy drama, Generation; season one, episode five.

Singles 
"Paraíso" was released on May 29, 2020, as the first single from the album. Monogem did a cover of "Bésame Mucho", by Consuelo Velázquez, which was released as the second single on November 20, 2020. This single is considered to be an ode to Monogem's grandmother, Hortencia, which she always plays on repeat.

On May 20, 2021, a third single named, "Sólo Amor", was released with a lyric video. A fourth single named, "Dame La Fuerza", was released on July 15, 2020, joined with a music video.

"Magia", which was chosen to be the lead single for the debut album, was released on August 26, 2020, with a music video. Following the release of her lead single, Hirsh revealed in the music video that she was expecting her first child with Jason Melvin.

Track listing 

Notes
 Soy Lo Que Soy was added to the debut album from the third extended play: So Many Ways.

Personnel 
Credits adapted from the album's liner notes of Gardenia.

Musicians 

 Monogem – vocals 
 Adam Tressler – guitar 
 Adam Christgau – drums, percussion 
 Guillermo E. Brown – guitar 
 Hailey Niswanger – alto saxophone

Production 

 Kyle Patrick – producer 
 Will Snyder – producer 
 Joe LaPorta – mastering 
 Jared Hirshland – co-mastering 
 Tim Latham – mixing 
 Ryan Gilligan – mixing

Artwork 

 Nehal Joshi – design
 Jenna Johns – photography

Release history

References 

2021 debut albums
Self-released albums
Spanish-language albums
Latin alternative albums
Pop albums by American artists
Latin music albums by American artists
Monogem albums